Partido Progressista  may refer to:

Progressive Party (Brazil)
Progressive Party (Portugal)